Fu Zhenghua (born 13 March 1955) is a former Chinese politician and public security officer. In March 2013, Fu was appointed as the Deputy Minister of Public Security (minister-level) and Deputy Communist Party Secretary of the Ministry of Public Security. Since 2015, Fu has served concurrently as the head of the 610 Office. He was also appointed as the Minister of Justice in 2018. Fu was known to be a close ally of Sun Lijun, he has come under investigation in October 2021 and was expelled from the Chinese Communist Party and removed from public office in March 2022. He was subsequently arrested, tried, and given a suspended death sentence.

Early life and education
Fu was born in Luan County, Hebei. In March 1955, he graduated from Peking University.

Career
Fu became involved in politics in December 1970, and he joined the Chinese Communist Party in September 1973.

He had a career in the Beijing police (Beijing Municipal Public Security Bureau) as an investigator. He took part in solving a number of high profile cases, including the "1996 Beijing Cash Truck Robbery case", the "1997 Bai Baoshan case", the "attack on Mentougou police" case, and the "Huang Guangyu case".

In January 2010, he was promoted to become secretary of Beijing Municipal Public Security Bureau, a position he held until 2013.

In February 2010, he was appointed director of Beijing Municipal Public Security Bureau, essentially the chief of police of the Chinese capital; he remained in that position until August 2013, when he was appointed the deputy minister of Public Security.

In May 2010, Fu closed down the Tianshang Renjian Night Club; his action was well received.

In the second half of 2013, Fu launched the 2013 Special Campaign Against Network Illegal Crimes of the People's Republic of China, he arrested Charles Xue, Qin Huohuo and Fu Xuesheng.

In February 2014, Chinese media reported that Fu launched the Anti-Vice Operation of the People's Republic of China. Since December 2014, Fu has been a member of the Central Political and Legal Affairs Commission.  In September 2015, it was revealed during Yu Zhengsheng's trip to Xinjiang that Fu was named the head of the 610 Office, founded to oversee the suppression of Falun Gong.

In March 2018, Fu was appointed as the minister of Justice, and held the position for two years.

On May 19, 2020, he became a member of the Social and Legal Affairs Committee of the National Committee of the Chinese People's Political Consultative Conference.

Downfall
The Central Commission for Discipline Inspection announced on October 2, 2021 that it was investigating him for "serious violations of discipline and national laws". On October 27, he was dismissed from public office and was removed from membership of China's top political advisory body, the Chinese People's Political Consultative Conference.

On March 31, 2022, he was expelled from the Chinese Communist Party and dismissed from public office. On April 21, he was arrested by the Supreme People's Procuratorate. On July 28, he stood trial at the Intermediate People's Court of Changchun on charges of bribe-taking and bending the law for personal gain. Prosecutors accused Fu of taking advantage of his official authority or position to seek gains for others regarding business operations, official positions and legal cases, in return for which he illegally accepted money and gifts worth 117 million yuan (about 17.36 million U.S. dollars) either by himself or through some of his close relatives. On September 22, he was handed a suspended death sentence that will be commuted to life imprisonment after two years, with no possibility of parole, for taking bribes worth more than 117 million yuan (16.76 million U.S. dollars) and bending the law for personal gains. He was deprived of political rights for life and all his properties were also confiscated.

References 

1955 births
Peking University alumni
Politicians from Tangshan
Living people
People's Republic of China politicians from Hebei
Chinese Communist Party politicians from Hebei
Chinese police officers
Members of the 19th Central Committee of the Chinese Communist Party
People from Luanzhou
Ministers of Justice of the People's Republic of China
Expelled members of the Chinese Communist Party
Chinese politicians convicted of corruption